Rosalinda Raquel Serfaty Rosenstock (born April 24, 1965, in Buenos Aires) is an Argentine-born Venezuelan television and theater actress of Moroccan Jewish and Berber Moroccan origin.

Biography
Rosalinda was born to Jewish parents Jaime Serfaty, her father, and mother, Mina Rosenstock. Her family moved to Venezuela from Argentina when she was 7 years old. Her artistic career began when she was about to finish high school when she enrolled in Escuela de Danza Contemporánea de Caracas (Caracas School of Contemporary Dance). While pursuing her artistic career, she continued her studies in Social Communication at the Universidad Católica Andrés Bello. While at university, she began doing modelling jobs in order to help out with her finances and studies.

After trying to get on television, her first acting role came in 1989 as the protagonist of the telenovela produced by Venevisión titled La Revancha. Her next acting role was playing the villain in the telenovela Mundo de Fieras on the same channel.

Personal life
In 1993, Rosalinda and her husband Ayush Benzaquen welcomed their first child, a daughter named Corina, and in 1996, they had another daughter named Ariana.

Filmography
1989: La Revancha as Isamar
1991: Mundo de Fieras as Jocelyn Palacios Anzola de Sartori Bustamante
1994: Peligrosa as Elisa
1998: Luz María as Angelina Mendoza y Rivero de Gonzalvez
2000: Amantes de Luna Llena as Valentina Linares
2001: La niña de mis ojos as Camila Olivares Sucre
2003: La invasora as Alicia Fuentes Manso
2004: Sabor a ti as Andreína Obregón
2005: Con toda el alma as Ana Cecilia
2009: ¡Qué Clase de Amor! as Ana María Sosa
2011: Natalia del Mar as Irene Lopez
2012: Mi ex me tiene ganas as Claudia

References

External links

Rosalinda Serfaty at VencorNarod

1965 births
Living people
Actresses from Buenos Aires
Argentine emigrants to Venezuela
Jewish Argentine actresses
Venezuelan telenovela actresses
Argentine people of Moroccan-Jewish descent
Venezuelan people of Moroccan-Jewish descent
Argentine Jews
Venezuelan Jews
Venezuelan women journalists